Faulding may refer to:
F. H. Faulding & Co
Faulding Florey Medal
Jennie Faulding Taylor born Jane Elizabeth Faulding

See also
Fauld (disambiguation)